Garbett is a surname. Notable people with the surname include:

Cyril Garbett (1875–1955), Anglican clergyman and Archbishop of York from 1942 until 1955
Eddie Garbett, English professional footballer 
Edward Garbett (1817–1887),  a religious figure and writer
James Garbett (1802–1879), British academic and clergyman who became Archdeacon of Chichester
John Garbett (born c. 1953), American film producer
Lee Garbett, British comic book artist born in the West Midlands
Len Garbett (1919–2009), English professional rugby league footballer
Matthew Garbett, New Zealand professional footballer
Paul Garbett, New Zealand chess player
Samuel Garbett (died 1803), English industrialist
Terry Garbett (born 1945), retired English footballer
Toby Garbett (born 1976), British rower
Marjorie Maynard, also known as Lady C. C. Garbett, was a British artist

Garbett is also a place name:
Garbett's Wood in West Sussex, England

See also 
Garbet
Garbeta
Garbutt (disambiguation)